Sollentuna Church is located in Sollentuna Municipality. It is one of the churches in Sollentuna Parish.

Churches in the Diocese of Stockholm (Church of Sweden)